Lisa Michelle Stebic, née Ruttenberg  (born May 19, 1969) is an American missing person. The mother of two went missing from her home in Plainfield, Illinois on April 30, 2007.

She has two visible tattoos, a small rose on her ankle and a large butterfly on her lower back.

Case
Her case has received widespread news coverage. Her husband, Craig Stebic, refused to talk to the police or to help in the investigation or search. The local CBS affiliate (WBBM-TV) broadcast a video of a rival station's reporter Amy Jacobson at the Stebic home wearing a bikini.

Jacobson, Craig Stebic's sister, Jill Webb, and her husband, Robert Webb, have all filed lawsuits against WBBM regarding airing of the video. Craig Stebic has never been named a suspect by police, although he has been called "a person of interest" in his wife's disappearance.

In October 2007, the FBI added pictures of Lisa and information about her disappearance to its kidnapped and missing-persons website.  Stebic's photo and information were shown on national television at the end of the October 11, 2007 broadcast of Without A Trace, a CBS drama about an FBI missing-persons team in New York City and detailed the next morning on The Early Show.

, Stebic is still a missing person.

See also
List of people who disappeared

References

External links
FBI Missing Person Investigation - Lisa Stebic
FindLisaStebic.com

1969 births
2000s missing person cases
Missing people
Missing person cases in Illinois
People from Plainfield, Illinois
History of women in Illinois